Vanessa Torres (born July 17, 1986, in Anaheim, California) is a professional skateboarder. She is sponsored by Meow Skateboards and is the first woman to win X Games gold.

In 2003 the X Games first featured female skateboarding competitions; Torres placed first, winning gold, in the street event (then called Park). Torres won silver in the X Games Street Competition in 2004 and placed in the top ten in 2005-2011 and 2014. In 2015 at the X Games in Austin and 2016 at the X Games in Oslo, Torres won bronze. She again placed in the top ten in 2016 and 2017.

She is featured in several women's skateboarding videos such as AKA: Girl Skater (2003), Getting Nowhere Faster (2004), and Quit Your Day Job (2014). She also appears in the video game Tony Hawk's Proving Ground, making her the third female as a playable skater to appear in the Tony Hawk's video game series after Elissa Steamer and Lyn-Z Adams Hawkins.

Torres is of Mexican descent from Modesto, California. She dropped out of high school to pursue skateboarding.  She splits her personal time living in San Diego and San Francisco, California.

References

External links

Living people
American skateboarders
American sportspeople of Mexican descent
1986 births
Female skateboarders
American sportswomen
LGBT skateboarders
X Games athletes
21st-century American women